Robert Daniels (born 1966) is an American boxer.

Robert Daniels may also refer to:
 Robert Anthony Daniels (born 1957), Canadian bishop
 Robert Vincent Daniels (1926–2010), American historian and educator
 Robert William Daniels Jr. or Bill Daniels (1920–2000), American cable TV executive and philanthropist

See also 
 Robert Daniel (disambiguation)
 Bob Daniels (disambiguation)